Kalendervägen 113.D is a bonus EP included with the initial pre-order copies of Jens Lekman's 2007 album Night Falls Over Kortedala.  It is a stripped-down 7-track medley of songs from Night Falls... as well as a Paul Simon cover from Graceland and two unreleased songs 'The Rain Has Got To Fall' and 'Our Last Swim In The Ocean'.

The title of the EP is in reference to the address of his old apartment in Gothenburg, Sweden where he recorded the EP by himself with a guitar and a loop pedal, as stated on the August 17, 2007 entry on his website.

"I'm slowly moving out of my old apartment to be homeless for a few months, and for the bonus cd I recorded a handful of songs as a last concert for these old brick walls. This is the cd you get if you've pre-ordered the album. It's called Kalendervägen 113.D and it has two unreleased songs on it "The Rain Has Got To Fall" and "Our Last Swim In The Ocean" as well as a couple of songs from Night Falls... and a Paul Simon song from Graceland I thought was suitable. It's me, a guitar and a loop pedal, nothing else.  For those of you who prefer it more au naturale."

Track listing
"Homeless" (Paul Simon cover)
"The Rain Has Got to Fall"
"Our Last Swim in the Ocean"
"Friday Night at the Drive-In Bingo"
"A Postcard to Nina"
"Shirin"
"I Am Leaving You Because I Don't Love You"

External links 
Jens Lekman Official Site

2007 EPs
Live EPs
Swedish-language albums
Jens Lekman EPs
2007 live albums
Service (record label) EPs
Service (record label) live albums